Thalis Tsirimokos (7 September 1954 – 19 June 2022) was a Greek footballer who played as a forward.

Personal life
Tsirimokos originated from a political family from Fthiotis.

References

1959 births
2022 deaths
Footballers from Athens
Greek footballers
Association football forwards
Super League Greece players
Kallithea F.C. players
PAS Giannina F.C. players
Aris Thessaloniki F.C. players
OFI Crete F.C. players
Apollon Smyrnis F.C. players
Greek football managers
Ethnikos Piraeus F.C. managers